Banjar Agung is a district (kecamatan) located in the Tulang Bawang Regency of Lampung in Sumatra, Indonesia.

Banjar Agung is the largest economic and central business in Tulang Bawang regency with its market known as Banjar Agung Unit 2 Market (Pasar Unit 2).

Village 
Banjar Agung is divided into eleven administrative villages, there are shown on table below:

Border 
The border district of Banjar Agung as follows ;

 Bordered by Banjar Margo District to the North.
 Bordered by Banjar Baru District to the South.
 Bordered by West Tulang Bawang Regency to the West.
 Bordered by Gedung Aji to the East.

List of schools

Middle schools 

 SMP Negeri 1 Banjar Agung
 SMP Negeri 2 Banjar Agung
 SMP Negeri 3 Banjar Agung
 SMP Lentera Harapan
 SMP IT Cendekia

Senior high schools 

 SMA Negeri 1 Banjar Agung
 SMK Negeri 1 Banjar Agung
 SMK Al-Iman
 SMK HMPTI
 SMK Nusantara
 SMK Kes Bhakti Nusantara

References 

Category:Tulang

Tulang Bawang Regency
Districts of Lampung